House of Odd is the third graphic novel featuring Dean Koontz's character Odd Thomas. It was released March 20, 2012. It is written by Landry Walker and Koontz, with illustrations by Queenie Chan in a manga style.

External links

2012 graphic novels
American graphic novels
Comics based on fiction
Novels by Dean Koontz
Original English-language manga
Del Rey Manga
Fiction books about precognition